The 1993 World Table Tennis Championships men's singles was the 42nd edition of the men's singles championship. 

Jean-Philippe Gatien defeated Jean-Michel Saive in the final, winning three sets to two to secure the title.

Results

See also
List of World Table Tennis Championships medalists

References

-